Ceferino Dario Labarda (born April 6, 1981 in Luján de Cuyo, Mendoza) is a bantamweight boxer from Argentina, who represented his native country at the 2000 Summer Olympics in Sydney, Australia, where he lost to Raimkul Malakhbekov of Russia. He won bronze medals at the 1998 World Junior Championships and 1999 Pan American Games.

Nicknamed "El Pelando San Cuss Cus", he made his professional debut in 2003.

Professional boxing record 

|-
| style="text-align:center;" colspan="8"|19 Wins (7 knockouts), 3 Loss
|-  style="text-align:center; background:#e3e3e3;"
|  style="border-style:none none solid solid; "|Res.
|  style="border-style:none none solid solid; "|Record
|  style="border-style:none none solid solid; "|Opponent
|  style="border-style:none none solid solid; "|Type
|  style="border-style:none none solid solid; "|Rd.,Time
|  style="border-style:none none solid solid; "|Date
|  style="border-style:none none solid solid; "|Location
|  style="border-style:none none solid solid; "|Notes
|- align=center
|Loss||19-3||align=left| Benoit Gaudet
|
|
|
|align=left|
|align=left|
|- align=center
|Loss||19-2||align=left| Billy Dib
|
|
|
|align=left|
|align=left|
|- align=center
|Win||19-1||align=left| Marcelo Antonio Gomez
|
|
|
|align=left|
|align=left|
|- align=center
|Loss||18-1||align=left| Steve Molitor
|
|
|
|align=left|
|align=left|
|- align=center
|Win||18-0||align=left| Marcelo Antonio Gomez
|
|
|
|align=left|
|align=left|
|- align=center
|Win||17-0||align=left| Marcelo Antonio Gomez
|
|
|
|align=left|
|align=left|
|- align=center
|Win||16-0||align=left| Diego Miguel Ramirez
|
|
|
|align=left|
|align=left|
|- align=center
|Win||15-0||align=left| Marcelo Antonio Gomez
|
|
|
|align=left|
|align=left|
|- align=center
|Win||14-0||align=left| Juan Carlos Cejas
|
|
|
|align=left|
|align=left|
|- align=center

External links
 
sports-reference

1981 births
Living people
Sportspeople from Mendoza Province
Bantamweight boxers
Boxers at the 1999 Pan American Games
Boxers at the 2000 Summer Olympics
Olympic boxers of Argentina
Argentine male boxers
Pan American Games bronze medalists for Argentina
Pan American Games medalists in boxing
South American Games silver medalists for Argentina
South American Games medalists in boxing
Competitors at the 2002 South American Games
Medalists at the 1999 Pan American Games